Zhigu may refer to:

Zhigu (1016–1055) or Emperor Xingzong of Liao
Zhigu, a historical town in present-day Tianjin, China
Zhigu station of the Tianjin Metro